Cecil Herbert Raybourn (1935 – October 21, 2017) was a professional baseball playerprofessional baseball player, scout, and New York Yankees Director of Latin American Operations who, in 1990, discovered and signed Panamanian MLB Hall of Famer Mariano Rivera.

Youth 
Raybourn was born in Panama City, Panama, and with his two siblings raised by his mother. While his athleticism and love for baseball became apparent at an early age, he was also musically inclined—balancing baseball and football with cello music lessons at the Panamanian National Conservatory.

Raybourn grew up bilingual and attended Balboa High School (class of 1955) in the former Panama Canal Zone where he played in various Panamanian leagues while earning letters in baseball, football, and track.

University 
Raybourn earned a four-year baseball scholarship to attend Bradley University (class of 1959) in Peoria, Illinois. He was twice named to the collegiate All Star team; in his senior year was named Bradley University Baseball Most Valuable Player; and after graduating with a Bachelor of Science in Physical Education, was inducted into the Bradley Athletics Hall of Fame in 1961. During his tenure at Bradley as a catcher - outfielder, Herb led the Bradley Braves to championship wins in 1956, 1957, and 1959 with batting averages of .387, .341, and .366, respectively.

While Raybourn loved playing professional ball, he also loved coaching and developing the raw talent he saw in others. He earned a Master of Science in Physical Education from East Texas State University in 1962.

Professional

Major League Baseball 
Raybourn was signed by the San Francisco Giants in 1958, where he had three seasons as a steady .300 hitter and was an All-Star player topping the league with a .385 batting average.  In 1960 he was named Rookie of the Year, an honor voted by the league’s sports writers, broadcasters, team managers, scorekeepers, and umpires.

Panamanian Professional Baseball League 
During off-seasons while playing for the Giants, Raybourn returned to Panama where he was signed as a catcher in the Panamanian Professional Baseball League for the Azucareros de Coclé. During his first year in 1959 he was named the Panamanian Professional League’s Rookie of the Year; in 1961 earned the title of the league’s Batting Champion; and in a year-end competition the same year was unanimously voted Rookie of the Year for all professional sports in Panama.  He returned to Panama to teach Physical Education and coach at Balboa High School in the former Canal Zone where his tenacity, ethics, and humble spirit influenced his students, and mentees.

Raybourn played in the Panamanian Professional Baseball League from 1959 – 1972, until the league folded. In 1972 he transferred to the Panama Canal Company Office of the Civil Affairs Director.

Scouting 
Raybourn began scouting in Panama and Latin America for Major League Baseball in 1969. He started his career in scouting with the Pittsburgh Pirates (1969-1976) quickly making a name for himself by bringing Manny Sanguillén, Rennie Stennett, and Omar Moreno to the Pirate organization. He is credited with being one of the real pioneers in Latin American scouting and responsible for putting Panama on the scouting map. Herb scouted for the New York Yankees in the seventies and again after retiring from the Panama Canal Company in 1987 and moving to Bradenton with his family to become a full-time scout for the first time. As a scout for Kansas City Royals (1986-1989) Herb signed David Howard, Vincent Garibaldo, and Carlos Maldonado. As Director of Latin American Operations for the New York Yankees in the early nineties, Herb discovered and signed the soon-to-be Hall of Famer, Mariano Rivera only after having seen nine pitches in an impromptu tryout he organized behind Rivera’s house in Puerto Caimito. 

Raybourn later signed Rivera’s cousin Ruben Rivera, relief pitcher Ramiro Mendoza, and outfielder Ricky Ledée for the Yankees. As the Yankees Director of Latin American Operations he built a baseball school in Caracas, Venezuela. He retired from baseball in 1998 as Director of Scouting for the Toronto Blue Jays to pursue other passions—including his grandchildren and the game of golf.

Social impact 
During his lifetime many articles were written regarding his impact on the players he recruited and the lives he changed as a result.

References

External links

Baseball people
Raybourn, Herbert
Raybourn, Herbert
Bradley Braves baseball players
Texas A&M University–Commerce alumni
New York Yankees scouts
Eugene Emeralds players
Fresno Giants players
Hastings Giants players
Pocatello Giants players
Rio Grande Valley Giants players
Sportspeople from Panama City